Henri Kontinen and John Peers were the defending champions, but lost in the second round to Radu Albot and Chung Hyeon.

Oliver Marach and Mate Pavić won the title, defeating Juan Sebastián Cabal and Robert Farah in the final, 6–4, 6–4.

Seeds

Draw

Finals

Top half

Section 1

Section 2

Bottom half

Section 3

Section 4

References

External links
Draw
 2018 Australian Open – Men's draws and results at the International Tennis Federation

Men's Doubles
Australian Open (tennis) by year – Men's doubles